Doug Kalitta (born August 20, 1964) is an American auto racing driver from Ypsilanti, Michigan and owner of airline Kalitta Charters. He started racing in open wheel cars on an oval. Kalitta won the 1994 USAC Midget rookie of the year title and the 1994 USAC Sprint car championship. He moved to drag racing in 1998 and, as of 2020, has been NHRA Top Fuel Championship runner-up a total of six times.

Open wheel oval racing
Kalitta formerly raced in USAC events. He was the 1991 USAC rookie of the year in the midget series, and won the 1994 championship in the sprint car category. Kalitta won 21 USAC events: 14 in midget races and 7 in sprint competitions.

Drag racing
In 1998 he joined the NHRA, becoming a top fuel drag racer. Kalitta finished second in the top fuel points race in 2003, 2004, 2006, 2016 and 2019. He is fifth on the all-time top fuel wins list; the most recent of his 49 victories (Kalitta also has 105 career final round appearances) came in winning at the Midwest Nationals in Illinois, on October 4th, 2020.

Personal life
Kalitta has a wife, Josie Kalitta, a son Mitchell Kalitta, and a daughter Avery Kalitta. Kalitta's father is the now-deceased Doug Kalitta Sr., and he is the nephew of Connie Kalitta, a member of the Motorsports Hall of Fame of America. Scott Kalitta, an NHRA driver who died on June 21, 2008 in a racing accident, was his cousin. He owns the airline Kalitta Charters.

References

Living people
1964 births
Sportspeople from Ypsilanti, Michigan
Racing drivers from Michigan
Dragster drivers
USAC Silver Crown Series drivers